Kossoff Burst is a 1959 Gibson Gibson Les Paul Standard that was played by Free guitarist Paul Kossoff from 1970-1976. The guitar was broken during a concert when Kossoff threw it in the air. The guitar is currently owned Guitar collector Kris Blakely aka “Fried Okra” and was purchased in 2016 through a private sale with Arthur Ram for an undisclosed amount. In 2011 the guitar was recreated and reissued by Gibson's Custom Shop.

History
Kossoff played the guitar from 1970 until his death in 1976. Kossoff played in the band Free and he broke the neck on the guitar in the 1970s when he threw it up in the air and failed to catch it during a concert. He then picked up Arthur Ramm's 1968 Gibson Les Paul Goldtop to finish the concert. He told Ramm he would like to keep the goldtop and he would give him the Les Paul that he broke during the concert after it was repaired. Kossoff repaired the guitar but did not keep his promise. After Kossoff's death the guitar was sold to Ramm by Paul Kossoff's father for 800 pounds, as this is what Koss owed his father for getting it out of hock. Thirty-nine years later, Arthur Ramm decided to place send the guitar to auction. The guitar was listed by Bonhams auction house in 2015 but later removed and returned to Arthur Ramm.   Guitar collector Kris Blakely, aka “Fried Okra,” acquired the guitar in 2016 through a private sale with Arthur Ramm for an undisclosed amount. In 2018 he allowed the guitar to be displayed at the Songbirds Guitar Museum.

Description
The guitar is a 1959 Gibson Les Paul in sunburst finish and it weighs . Just behind the tailpiece there are a number of dents and scratches, possibly caused by strings being fed through the stop bar tailpiece. In the early 1970s the guitar's neck was broken near the fifth fret. Luthier Sam Li repaired the break.  A compelling detail is the fact that the bridge pickup screw coil of the Kossoff Burst bridge PAF has a very old rewind repair. The screw bobbin is physically mounted backwards on the baseplate and reverse wound with Formvar magnet wire. The age of the tape, repair history of the guitar and manner of the repair strongly point to a guided rewind done by a highly skilled and experienced luthier. Sam Li is well known for his finishing and wood working skills, but also known for his "unconventional" pickup repairs, traits also exemplified by his work on another legendary guitar: "Greeny," the Peter Green Burst now owned by Kirk Hammett of Metallica.  The guitar headstock of the Kossoff instrument has been rebuilt from the fifth fret and painted in a red lacquer. The body and neck of the guitar are Honduran mahogany and the maple top cap on the body is beautifully bookmatched maple. The bridge is an unoriginal ABR1 and the bridge pickup volume pot is unoriginal.

Legacy
The guitar has been recreated and reissued by Gibson's Custom Shop. Gibson had the original guitar digitally scanned, and measured. They claim to have documented the guitar in intimate detail in order to recreate the original guitar.

See also 
 List of guitars

References

External links
Video Paul Kossoff -Gibson Les Paul Standard - Burst
Video Paul Kossoff burst from Arthur Ramm

Gibson Les Paul
Individual guitars
Instruments of musicians